Rastislav Vnučko (born 21 January 1975) is a Slovak former competitive figure skater. He is a seven-time Slovak national champion. Internationally, he represented Czechoslovakia until its dissolution and then Slovakia. He was coached by Vladimír Dvojnikov in Bratislava. After retiring from competition, Vnučko became a skating coach. He works in Sweden.

Competitive highlights

References 

1975 births
Slovak male single skaters
Czechoslovak male single skaters
Living people
Figure skaters from Bratislava